The President's House (also known as Quarters AA) is the home of the President of the Naval War College in Newport, Rhode Island. The house is a wooden, three-story building in Colonial Revival style located on a hill on Coaster's Harbor Island, overlooking Coaster's Harbor, Dewey Field, and Narragansett Bay.

The house was built in 1896 by local Newport, Rhode Island, architect and builder Creighton Withers at the cost of $16,226.  Built originally as "Quarters B" for the commandant of the Naval Training Station, Newport, the first president of the Naval War College to occupy it was Rear Admiral French Ensor Chadwick, in June 1903.

Every Naval War College president except for Charles Stillman Sperry (1903–1906) and William Ledyard Rodgers (1911–1913) has lived in the house since that time. Among the most famous residents of the house have been Admirals William Sims, Raymond A. Spruance, Stansfield Turner, and James Stockdale.

It was listed on the National Register of Historic Places in 1989.

List of occupants
 Rear Adm. French Ensor Chadwick        	June 1903           -          	Nov 16, 1903
 Rear Adm. John Porter Merrell             May 24, 1906        -           Oct 06, 1909
 Rear Adm. Raymond Perry Rodgers        	Oct 6, 1909         -           Nov 20, 1911
 Rear Adm. Austin Melvin Knight            Dec 15, 1913        -           Feb 16, 1917
 Captain   William S. Sims          	Feb 16, 1917        -           Apr 28, 1917

From April 28, 1917, to April 11, 1919, the academic activities of the Naval War College were discontinued due to United States participation in World War I. During this period, the reserve force of the Second Naval District used the college buildings and a series of three acting presidents maintained the administrative side of the college.

 Rear Adm. William S. Sims              Apr 11, 1919            -      Oct 14, 1922
 Rear Adm. Clarence Stewart Williams         Nov 3, 1922         -          Sept 5, 1925
 Rear Adm. William Veazie Pratt              Sept 5, 1925       -           Sept 17, 1927
 Rear Adm. Joel Roberts Poinsett Pringle     Sept 19. 1927      -           May 30, 1930
 Rear Adm. Harris Laning                     June 16, 1930      -           May 13, 1933
 Rear Adm. Luke McNamee                      Jun 3, 1933        -     	May 29, 1934
 Rear Adm. Edward Clifford Kalbfus           June 18, 1934      -    	Dec 15, 1936
 Rear Adm. Charles Philip Snyder             Jan 2, 1937      -        	May 27, 1939
 Rear Adm. Edward Clifford Kalbfus           June 30, 1939      -   	June 16, 1942
 Admiral   Edward Clifford Kalbfus (Ret.)    June 16, 1942	     -	        November 2, 1942	
 Rear Adm. William Satterlee Pye             Nov 2, 1942        -   	July 1, 1944
 Vice Adm. William Satterlee Pye (Ret.)      July 1, 1944       -    	Mar 1, 1946
 Admiral   Raymond Ames Spruance          	  Mar 1, 1946        -   	July 1, 1948
 Vice Adm. Donald Bradford Beary             Nov 1, 1948        -   	May 28, 1950
 Vice Adm. Richard L. Conolly               Dec 1, 1950         - 	        Nov 2, 1953
 Vice Adm. Lynde D. McCormick                May 3, 1954        -   	Aug 16, 1956
 Rear Adm. Thomas H. Robbins, Jr.            Sept 5, 1956       -   	Aug 1, 1957
 Vice Adm. Stuart H. Ingersoll               Aug 13, 1957       -    	June 30, 1960
 Vice Adm. Bernard L. Austin                 June 30, 1960      -    	July 31, 1964
 Vice Adm. Charles L. Melson                 July 31, 1964      -    	Jan 25, 1966
 Vice Adm. John T. Hayward                   Feb 15, 1966       -     	Aug 30, 1968
 Vice Adm. Richard G. Colbert                Aug 30, 1968       -    	Aug 17, 1971
 Vice Adm. Benedict J. Semmes, Jr.           Aug 17, 1971       -    	Jun 30, 1972
 Vice Adm. Stansfield Turner                 June 30, 1972      -     	August 9, 1974
 Vice Adm. Julien J. LeBourgeois             Aug 9, 1974        -   	April 1, 1977
 Rear Adm. Huntington Hardesty               April 1, 1977      -     	Oct 13, 1977
 Vice Adm. James B. Stockdale                Oct 13, 1977       -     	Aug 22, 1979
 Rear Adm. Edward F. Welch, Jr.              Aug 22, 1979       -  	Aug 17, 1982
 Rear Adm. James E. Service                  Oct 14, 1982       -    	Jul 12, 1985
 Rear Adm. Ronald F. Marryott                August 8, 1985     -     	Aug 12, 1986
 Rear Adm. John A. Baldwin                   Sept 2, 1986       -    	Aug 11, 1987
 Rear Adm. Ronald J. Kurth                   August 11, 1987    -     	July 17, 1990
 Rear Adm. Joseph C. Strasser                July 17, 1990      -    	June 29, 1995
 Rear Adm. James R. Stark                    June 29, 1995      -   	July 24, 1998
 Vice Adm. Arthur K. Cebrowski               July 24, 1998      -   	Aug 22, 2001
 Rear Adm. Rodney P. Rempt                   Aug 22, 2001       -  	July 9, 2003
 Rear Adm. Ronald A. Route                   July 9, 2003	     -	        August 12, 2004
 Rear Adm. Jacob Shuford			  October 2004       -          Nov 6, 2008
 Rear Adm. James P. Wisecup                  July 6, 2010       -           March 30, 2011
 Rear Adm. John N. Christenson               March 30, 2011     -           July 14, 2013
 Rear Adm.  Walter E. Carter Jr.             July 15, 2013      -           ca. July 2014
 Rear Adm.  P. Gardner Howe, III             ca. July 2014      -           ca. July 2016
 Rear Adm.  Jeffrey A. Harley                ca. July 2016      -           ca. June 2019
 Rear Adm.  Shoshana S. Chatfield            ca. August 2019    -

See also

National Register of Historic Places listings in Newport County, Rhode Island

References
John B. Hattendorf, et al., Sailors and Scholars: The Centennial History of the U.S. Naval War College. Newport: Naval War College Press, 1984

Houses on the National Register of Historic Places in Rhode Island
Houses in Newport, Rhode Island
Naval War College
 
National Register of Historic Places in Newport, Rhode Island